Procottus jeittelesii, the  red sculpin or red Baikal sculpin, is a species of ray-finned fish belonging to the family Cottidae, the typical sculpins. This species is endemic to Lake Baikal in Russia. It has a red spotted or banded pattern on a light background. The red sculpin resembles two of its close relatives, the smaller P. gurwici and the larger P. major.

The red sculpin's diet consists of zoobenthos, especially amphipods but also oligochaetes. Despite its small size, it is caught and eaten by locals, and also eaten by the Baikal seal and other fish.

References

Red sculpin
Fish described in 1874
Endemic fauna of Russia
Fish of Lake Baikal